Gheorghe Titu is a Romanian sprint canoer who competed from the late 1970s to the mid-1980s. He won three medals at the ICF Canoe Sprint World Championships with two silvers (C-1 10000 m: 1983, C-2 10000 m: 1979) and a bronze (C-1 10000 m: 1982).

References

Living people
Romanian male canoeists
Year of birth missing (living people)
ICF Canoe Sprint World Championships medalists in Canadian